No Bueno is the second single from Nadia Oh's second studio album, Colours (2011). It was written and produced by Space Cowboy and has been noted for popularizing the Dave Nada created genre Moombahton.

Music video
The video premiered August 1, 2011  and featured the censored edit of the song however the video only lasts 1 minute and 48 seconds long. The video sees 'Oh in front of numerous colour-changing screens donning white shirts with several slogans from past singles such as; Taking Ova The Dancefloor, Hot Like Wow and Nadia Oh Yo.

Reception
PopJustice featured the single as their "Song of the Day" saying:
"Several things about this song - for example the not exactly half-hearted use of Auto Tune - are fucking awful but the popmoombahton epic stands its ground with the fantastic pop chorus."

Release
"No Bueno" was also released as a digital EP, featuring remixes by DJ DLG, SAiNT and Cory Martin, "who opts for a crowd-pleasing pop-dance vibe."

Track listing
No Bueno (Remixes) - EP
"No Bueno (Radio Edit)" – 3:09
"No Bueno (Original)" – 4:40
"No Bueno (DJ DLG Remix)" – 5:24
"No Bueno (SAiNT Remix)" – 4:31
"No Bueno (Cory Martin Remix)" – 4:37

References 

2011 singles
Electronic songs
2011 songs